Planets of Old is an extended play released by American alternative rock band Cave In. This EP is the first release of new material from the band since their split in 2006. Additionally, this is the first Cave In release to feature Adam McGrath on lead vocals (on "The Red Trail").

Recording and release
Cave In intended to record and release an EP rather than a full-length album so that any new material could be quickly recorded and released. Planets of Old was originally made available at Cave In's reunion show on July 19, 2009 and was later made available to the general public on July 28, 2009 through Hydra Head Records. The song "Retina Sees Rewind" was released on July 8, 2009 on iTunes. Planets of Old was originally exclusive to 12" vinyl, but was later released on CD in January 2010. The CD version includes a DVD featuring the live performance from Cave In's reunion show on July 19, 2009. Some versions also included a limited edition CD featuring audio from the same live show.

Track listing

Planets of Old CD/LP
All songs written by Cave In.
 "Cayman Tongue" – 6:40
 "Retina Sees Rewind" – 2:30
 "The Red Trail" – 2:14
 "Air Escapes" – 3:11
 "Retina Sees Rewind" (Japanese bonus track) – 2:49

Live at Great Scott DVD
 "Luminance"
 "Retina Sees Rewind"
 "Moral Eclipse"
 "Juggernaut"
 "Dark Driving"
 "The Red Trail"
 "Cayman Tongue"
 "Trepanning"
 "Air Escapes"
 "Summit Fever"
 "Vicious Circles"
 "Big Riff"
 "Inflatable Dream"

Personnel
Album and DVD personnel as listed in CD liner notes.

CD and LP
Cave In
 Stephen Brodsky – vocals, guitar
 Caleb Scofield – vocals, bass guitar
 Adam McGrath – vocals, guitar
 John-Robert Conners – drums

Production and art
 Recorded and mixed at Camp Street Studios in Cambridge, Massachusetts on October 8 and 15, 2008
 Adam Taylor – engineer
 Johnny Northrup – assistant engineer
 Alex Hartman – assistant engineer
 Nick Zampiello – mixing at New Alliance East in Boston, Massachusetts
 Aaron Turner – drawings and construction

DVD
Filming and production
 Recorded live at Great Scott on July 19, 2009
 Joe Constantine – camera, editing
 Carly Carioli – technical assistance
 Ryan Stewart – technical assistance
 Matt Sutton – live sound
 Nick Zampiello – live mix
 Reid Haithcock – photography
 A. Dernavich – poster design

Additional notes
 "Retina Sees Rewind (demo)" recorded at Club Awesome in September 2008
 "Segue 4" recorded at 4 Imrie Road #3 in Allston, Massachusetts in 1998

References

External links
planetsofold.com

2009 EPs
Cave In albums
Hydra Head Records EPs